Thenthamaraikulam is a panchayat town in Kanniyakumari district in the Indian state of Tamil Nadu.

Demographics
 India census, Thenthamaraikulam had a population of 11,068. Males constitute 49% of the population and females 51%. Thenthamaraikulam has an average literacy rate of 82%, higher than the national average of 59.5%: male literacy is 84%, and female literacy is 81%. In Thenthamaraikulam, 10% of the population is under 6 years of age.

References

Cities and towns in Kanyakumari district